William Leroy "Leo" McCulloch (31 May 1896 – 31 July 1971) was an Australian rules footballer who played with  and  in the Victorian Football League (VFL).

The son of William Andrew McCulloch and Anne Monica McCarthy, Leo McCulloch grew up in the Richmond area and commenced his football career playing for the Richmond Depot Tramways team. He played three games for Richmond during the 1918 VFL season and was described as a "heavy chap" who did fairly well but soon returned to junior football.

Leo McCulloch worked for the Tramways and then in the CUB Brewery until he retired a few years before his death in 1971.

References

External links 
 
 

1896 births
1971 deaths
Australian rules footballers from Victoria (Australia)
Richmond Football Club players
Hawthorn Football Club players